Little Missouri River can refer to two rivers in the United States:

Little Missouri River (Arkansas) in Arkansas
Little Missouri River (North Dakota) in Wyoming, Montana, South Dakota and North Dakota

See also 
 Little Missouri (disambiguation)